The Eagle Manufacturing Company of Appleton, Wisconsin, United States, first entered the farm equipment market in 1906 with a  tractor. In 1899 the company was located at 671 Superior St in Appleton Wisconsin. In 1904 it built a production facility designed by architect Wallace W. De Long. It returned to the marketplace several years later, in 1929 offering a 20-35 Model E. Based on a two-cylinder traction engine design, the engine measured 8.00x9.00 inches in bore and stroke. A truly massive affair, it was rated at 20 drawbar horsepower and 35 belt-pulley horsepower. Eagle also built its Model H alongside the Model E from 1926 to 1930. With an identical  bore to the Model E, but a  longer stroke at 10.00 inches, the Model H created a brawny  at the drawbar. Eagle was one of the first tractor manufacturers to use a 6-cylinder engine. It switched from 2 cylinders to 6 cylinders in 1930. Eagle built tractors from 1906, but halted production during World War II never to start its assembly lines again.

References 

"Farm Tractors", by Andrew Morland

History of Wisconsin
Appleton, Wisconsin
Tractor manufacturers of the United States
Defunct manufacturing companies based in Wisconsin